Bartley is a family name and a given name.

Bartley may also refer to:
Bartley MRT station, an MRT station on the Circle line in Joo Seng, Toa Payoh, Singapore
Bartley Secondary School, a school in Singapore
Bartley, Hampshire, England, UK
Bartley Green, an area in Birmingham, England, UK
Bartley Reservoir, a reservoir in Birmingham, England, UK
Bartley Water, a stream in Hampshire, England, UK
Bartley, Nebraska, U.S.
Bartley, West Virginia, U.S.